Guararapes is a municipality near Araçatuba in the  state of São Paulo in Brazil. The population is 33,100 (2020 est.) in an area of 956 km². The elevation is 415 m. This place name comes from the Tupi language, meaning "drums".

References

Municipalities in São Paulo (state)